Lasi or LASI may refer to:
 Lasi people, an ethnic group of Pakistan
 Lasi dialect, an Indo-Aryan language of Pakistan 
 Lasi (letter), a letter of the Georgian alphabet
 LasI, or Acyl-homoserine-lactone synthase, an enzyme
 Johann Lasi, a World War I pilot

See also 
 Laasi, a village in Estonia
 Lassi (disambiguation)
 Lasy in Poland
 Iasi (disambiguation)